Vladimír Chaloupka (born 25 January 1976) is a Czech footballer who played as a midfielder and forward. He made over 100 appearances in the Czech First League between 1993 and 2001.

References

External links
 
 

1976 births
Living people
Czech footballers
Czech Republic youth international footballers
Czech Republic under-21 international footballers
Czech First League players
FC Zbrojovka Brno players
FK Jablonec players
FC Viktoria Plzeň players
Association football midfielders
Association football forwards